The Chiba Kōgyō Bank is a Japanese regional bank founded in 1952 and located in Chiba city, the capital of Chiba Prefecture.

In 2016 the bank was number 1935 on the list of Forbes Global 2000 biggest public companies.

History 
1952 - Chiba Kogyo Bank was founded on 18 January
1972 - in March was completed the current head office and in September the bank was listed on the Tokyo Stock Exchange, part 2
1973 - in August introduction to the Tokyo Stock Exchange, part 1
1974 - in May was completed the administrative center
1977 - in April started the Foreign exchange online operation and the Chiba Warranty Service (now Chiba Kogyo Card Service)
1983 - introduced the Chiba general lease. 
1986 - started the Chiba Kogyo Business Service
1991 - founded the Chiba Nikko Bank Computer Software
2004 - accounting system moved to the NTT DATA Regional Bank Collaboration Center
2012 - started the partnership to share ATMs with the Joyo Bank, Kanto Tsukuba Bank, Tokyo Tomin Bank, Musashino Bank, Yamanashi Chuo Bank and Bank of Yokohama. 
2009 - merge of the Chiba Guarantee Service and the Chiba Bank UCS Card
2013 - public repayment ¥60 bln. of public funds.

See also 
List of banks in Asia

References 

Article contains translated text from 千葉興業銀行 on the Japanese Wikipedia retrieved on 29 March 2017.

External links 

Homepage

Companies based in Chiba Prefecture
Regional banks of Japan
Banks established in 1952
Japanese companies established in 1952